Jerome Kitzke (born 1955) is a composer who grew up along the southwestern shore of Lake Michigan in South Milwaukee, Wisconsin.

History
He received his B.F.A. from the University of Wisconsin–Milwaukee, and moved to New York City in 1984. In 1992 Kitzke formed his performing group Mad Coyote. His music has also been performed by the Milwaukee Symphony, the New Juilliard Ensemble, Essential Music, Present Music, Earplay, Zeitgeist, Guy Klucevsek, Margaret Leng Tan, ETHEL and Kathleen Supové. Kitzke has received grants from the National Endowment for the Arts, American Music Center, Meet the Composer, ASCAP, and BMI. In 2004 and 2006 he visited the Randolph School in Wappingers Falls, New York to compose music for their shows. He even put music to Allen Ginsberg's poem Green Automobile, which was included on his most recent album The Paha Sapa Give-Back (Innova Recordings, 2014). He is a quarter Persian.

Music

Chamber Works
A Keening Wish, narrator and ensemble
Alone On A Hill in Grandfather Night, mixed trio
Breath and Bone, accordion solo
Haunted America, mixed quartet     
In Bone Colored Light, mixed sextet
Mad Coyote Madly Sings, large mixed ensemble 
Present Music, large mixed ensemble
Regina Takes the Holy Road, 3 December 1994, mixed quintet
She Left in the Crow Black Night, clarinet, unac
Teeth of Heaven, mixed sextet
The Big Gesture, mixed trio
The Character of American Sunlight, percussion ensemble, mixed quintet
The Earth Only Endures, percussion solo
The Paha Sapa Give-Back, piano and ensemble, percussion ensemble
The Redness of Blood, mixed quartet
We Need to Dream All This Again, mixed quintet
Winter Count, narrator and ensemble

Vocal Works
171st Chorus, medium voice
Box Death Hollow, vocal soloists and ensemble, men's chorus and ensemble

Solo Piano
Sunflower Sutra
The Animist Child

Musical Theatre
The Paha Sapa Give-Back
Woope

References

External links
Peermusic Classical: Jerome Kitzke Composer's Publisher and Bio
Breath and Bone recording
Alive and Composing: Interview with Jerome Kitzke

Musicians from Milwaukee
American male classical composers
American classical composers
20th-century classical composers
University of Wisconsin–Milwaukee alumni
Living people
1955 births
20th-century American composers
People from South Milwaukee, Wisconsin
Classical musicians from Wisconsin
20th-century American male musicians